Path of Unreason is a science fiction novel by American writer George O. Smith. It was published in 1958 by Gnome Press in an edition of 5,000 copies, of which only 3,000 were bound.  The novel is an expansion of Smith's story "The Kingdom of the Blind" which first appeared in the magazine Startling Stories in 1947.

Plot introduction
The novel concerns a physicist who is trying to explain the mysterious "Lawson Radiation" while his researches drive him insane.

Reception
Galaxy reviewer Floyd C. Gale gave Path a negative review, rating the novel with two stars out of five and writing that "it is a story that Smith evidently had a lot of fun writing but that the reader will find more difficult to enjoy."

References

Sources

External links

1958 American novels
1958 science fiction novels
American science fiction novels
Works originally published in Startling Stories
Gnome Press books